Hugh Cook may refer to:

 Hugh Cook (Canadian novelist) (born 1942), Canadian novelist
 Hugh Cook (science fiction author) (1956–2008), English-born, New Zealand-educated novelist, who formerly lived in Japan

See also
 Hugh Cook Faringdon (died 1539), Benedictine monk